Laurence (Laurie) Marks (born 1954) is an American professor of materials science and engineering at Northwestern University (1985–present). He is known for contributions to the study of nanoparticles as well as work in the fields of electron microscopy, diffraction and crystallography. He is a fellow of the American Physical Society. He was awarded the Warren Award by the American Crystallographic Association in 2015 for his contributions to electron diffraction, and the 2017 ICSOS Surface Structure Prize for his contribution to surface structure determination applying both experimental and theoretical methods.

Early life and education

Marks attended the Trinity School of John Whitgift in Croydon. As a teenager Marks played chess competitively and went on to win the British Chess Championship Under 21 in 1973.

In 1973 Marks was awarded a scholarship to King's College at University of Cambridge. He graduated in 1976 with a B.S. in Chemistry in 1976. From 1976 to 1980 he was a research student at the Cavendish Laboratory at Cambridge. There he worked with Archibald Howie on electron microscopy and the structure of metal crystals. He received his Ph.D. in Physics from Cambridge in 1980. His thesis topic was The structure of small silver particles.

From 1980 to 1983 Marks was a post-doctoral fellow in Archibald Howie's group at the Cavendish. In 1983 he moved to the United States and was a post-doctoral fellow in John M. Cowley's group at Arizona State University in Tempe, Arizona.

Career
In March 1985 Marks joined the faculty of Northwestern University as an assistant professor in the Department of Materials Science & Engineering.  In June 1992 he was promoted to full professor.

Honors and awards
 Alfred P. Sloan Research Fellowship, 1987 
 Burton Medal, Electron Microscopy Society of America, 1989
 Fellow of the American Physical Society for his "contributions to quantitative imaging and diffraction methods for determining the atomic structure of surfaces and bulk materials." American Physical Society, 2001
 Astor Lectureship, Oxford University, 2015
 Warren Award, American Crystallographic Association, 2015
 ICSOS Surface Structure Prize, 2017

Selected publications

References

External links
 The Marks Research Group
 Google Scholar Page

21st-century American physicists
1954 births
Living people
Fellows of the American Physical Society
Tribologists
Crystallographers